Hrvoje Barišić (born 3 February 1991) is a Croatian-born Bosnian-Herzegovinian professional footballer who plays as a centre-back for Bosnian Premier League club Zrinjski Mostar.

Club career
Born in Split, Barišić graduated from the academy of Mosor. In 2011, he was invited by Dugopolje to feature in for friendlies for the club.

He made his international debut by playing the last 2 minutes of an UEFA Europa League encounter for Split against Domžale.

Barišić won the 2013–14 Bosnian Premier League with Zrinjski Mostar. In 2014, he returned to Croatia and penned a two year deal with Slaven Belupo. He made his debut for the club in a 4–0 defeat against Dinamo Zagreb.

In January 2015, Barišić returned to Bosnia and Herzegovina, this time through a six month loan deal with Vitez.

At the end of the season, he terminated his contract with Slaven Belupo after he felt that he was surplus to the club. He subsequently signed permanently with Vitez, penning a one year deal. In the two seasons he played for the club, he made 49 league appearances, scoring 2 goals.

While playing for Vitez, Barišić won the attraction of Bosnian club Sarajevo as well as clubs from Poland. In May 2017, he left Vitez by mutual consent.

In July 2017, he returned to Zrinjski Mostar on a two year contract. In May 2018, Barišić once again won the Bosnian Premier League title with Zrinjski. He left Zrinjski in June 2019 after his contract with the club expired.

On 13 June 2019, he signed a contract with Liga I club Sepsi OSK. He left Sepsi in July 2020 after his contract expired.

On 30 July 2020, Barišić again came back to Bosnia and Herzegovina after joining Tuzla City. He made his official debut for Tuzla City on 8 August 2020 in a league match against Krupa. Barišić scored his first goal for Tuzla City in a league game against Olimpik on 23 August 2020. He left Tuzla City in June 2021.

On 25 June 2021, Barišić again returned to Zrinjski Mostar, signing a two-year contract.

International career
Barišić played for the Croatia U21 national team in 2011, making 1 appearance, but not scoring a goal.

He made his senior debut however for Bosnia and Herzegovina, in a December 2021 friendly match away against the United States.

Honours
Dugopolje
2. HNL: 2011–12

Zrinjski Mostar
Bosnian Premier League: 2013–14, 2017–18, 2021–22

References

External links
 
DMfootball profile

1991 births
Living people
Footballers from Split, Croatia
Association football defenders
Croatian footballers
Croatia under-21 international footballers
Bosnia and Herzegovina footballers
Bosnia and Herzegovina international footballers
NK Mosor players
NK Dugopolje players
RNK Split players
NK Slaven Belupo players
HŠK Zrinjski Mostar players
NK Vitez players
FK Tuzla City players
Sepsi OSK Sfântu Gheorghe players
Croatian Football League players
Premier League of Bosnia and Herzegovina players
Liga I players
Croatian expatriate footballers
Croatian expatriate sportspeople in Bosnia and Herzegovina
Expatriate footballers in Romania
Croatian expatriate sportspeople in Romania